Hamdy Basiony Hassan (born 16 April 1965) is an Egyptian weightlifter. He competed in the men's middleweight event at the 1992 Summer Olympics.

References

External links
 

1965 births
Living people
Egyptian male weightlifters
Olympic weightlifters of Egypt
Weightlifters at the 1992 Summer Olympics
Place of birth missing (living people)